In the embryonic development of vertebrates, pharyngeal pouches form on the endodermal side between the pharyngeal arches. The pharyngeal grooves (or clefts) form the lateral ectodermal surface of the neck region to separate the arches.

The pouches line up with the clefts, and these thin segments become gills in fish.

Specific pouches

First pouch
The endoderm lines the future auditory tube (Pharyngotympanic Eustachian tube), middle ear, mastoid antrum, and inner layer of the tympanic membrane. Derivatives of this pouch are supplied by Mandibular nerve.

Second pouch
 Contributes the middle ear, palatine tonsils, supplied by the facial nerve.

Third pouch
 The third pouch possesses Dorsal and Ventral wings. Derivatives of the dorsal wings include the inferior parathyroid glands, while the ventral wings fuse to form the cytoreticular cells of the thymus. The main nerve supply to the derivatives of this pouch is Cranial Nerve IX, glossopharyngeal nerve.

Fourth pouch
Derivatives include:
 superior parathyroid glands and ultimobranchial body which forms the parafollicular C-Cells of the thyroid gland.
 Musculature and cartilage of larynx (along with the sixth pharyngeal arch).
 Nerve supplying these derivatives is Superior laryngeal nerve.

Fifth pouch
 Rudimentary structure, becomes part of the fourth pouch contributing to thyroid C-cells.

Sixth pouch
 The fourth and sixth pouches contribute to the formation of the musculature and cartilage of the larynx. Nerve supply is by the recurrent laryngeal nerve.

See also 
 Pharyngeal arch (often called branchial arch although this is more specifically a fish structure)
 DiGeorge syndrome
 List of human cell types derived from the germ layers

References

External links
  (Item #1 at Fig. 14)
 
 
 
 Outline at howard.edu (scroll down to "III. THE PHARYNGEAL POUCHES")

Animal developmental biology
Pharyngeal arches
Human head and neck